Stunning elections are a process of democratization in authoritarian or hybrid regimes through partially free elections in which the opposition either wins, or forms a majority in parliament and begins to significantly influence the decision-making process.

The hybrid regime may hold a clean election if the ruling elites are confident in their popularity. Usually, the return of some democratic institutions by an autocrat is done in order to increase the ruler's legitimacy, including international respect. However, an underestimation of the risks (caused by broken feedback mechanisms) may result in unexpected outcomes.

Samuel P. Huntington linked the term stunning election to the situation in which an autocrat-organized election, produces an unexpectedly bad outcome.

Paul Pierson noted that in developed democracies, candidates often change their rhetoric depending on the tactics and preferred audience of their opponents. He also noted that voters changing their behavior in such a way as not to "waste" their vote on a popular, but impassable candidate, leads to unplanned heterogeneity in the election results, especially in conditions of pluralism. Andreas Schedler in the footsteps of George Tsebelis argued that even if the results of the overturning elections are not recognized by the ruling elites (stolen elections), street protests may lead to a regime change through democratization-by-election.

References 

Democratization
Elections terminology